Metropolitano de Hockey may refer to:

 Metropolitano de Hockey (Men)
 Metropolitano de Hockey (Women)